The 6th Annual ASTRA Awards were presented on Monday, 21 April 2008 at the Hordern Pavilion in Sydney.

Nominations and winners

Hall of Fame
 Channel of the Year
 Winner:
 FOX8
 Nominated:
 The History Channel
 Sky News
 Nickelodeon
 Fox Sports

Talent
 Most Outstanding Performance by an Actor – Male
 Winner:
 Stephen Curry – The King (TV1)
 Nominated:
 Brendan Cowell – Love My Way (Showtime)
 Wayne Hope – Stupid, Stupid Man (TV1)
 Ben Mendelsohn – Love My Way (Showtime)
 Dan Wyllie – Love My Way (Showtime)

 Most Outstanding Performance by an Actor – Female
 Winner:
 Claudia Karvan – Love My Way (Showtime)
 Nominated:
 Diana Glenn – Satisfaction (Showcase)
 Asher Keddie – Love My Way (Showtime)
 Bojana Novakovic – Satisfaction (Showcase)
 Alison Whyte – Satisfaction (Showcase)

 Most Outstanding Performance by a Presenter
 Winner:
 David Speers – Agenda (Sky News)
 Nominated:
 Jimmy Barnes – The Know (Max)
 Helen Dalley – Sunday Business (Sky News)
 James Kerley – Cash Cab (Channel [V])
 Steve Liebmann – Crime Investigation Australia (Crime & Investigation Network)
 Stuart MacGill – Stuart MacGill Uncorked (LifeStyle Food)

 Most Outstanding Performance by a Broadcast Journalist
 Winner:
 Kieran Gilbert (Sky News)
 Nominated:
 Rebecca Perrie (Fox Sports News)
 Michael Willesee (Sky News)
 Gavin Morris (The Weather Channel)

Subscribers’ Choice
 Favourite Program 
 Winner:
 Australia's Next Top Model (FOX8)
 Nominated:
 American Chopper Australia (Discovery Channel)
 Dangerous (FOX8)
 The King (TV1)
 Love My Way (Showtime)
 Parkinson: The Shane Warne Interview (UKTV)
 Satisfaction (Showcase)
 Stupid, Stupid Man (TV1)

 Favourite International Program 
 Winner:
 High School Musical 2 (Disney Channel)
 Nominated:
 The Daily Show with Jon Stewart (The Comedy Channel)
 Deadliest Catch (Discovery Channel Australia)
 Dexter (Showcase)
 Grand Designs (The LifeStyle Channel)
 Gossip Girl (FOX8)
 MythBusters Supersized Special (Discovery Channel Australia)
 The Riches (Showcase)

 Favourite International Personality or Actor
 Winner:
 Gordon Ramsay – Hell's Kitchen (LifeStyle Food)
 Nominated:
 Minnie Driver – The Riches (Showcase)
 Zac Efron – High School Musical 2 (Disney Channel)
 Michael C. Hall – Dexter (Showcase)
 Eddie Izzard – The Riches (Showcase)
 MythBusters Team – MythBusters (Discovery Channel Australia)
 Michael Parkinson – Parkinson: The Shane Warne Interview (UKTV)
 Trinny and Susannah – Trinny & Susannah Undress... (The LifeStyle Channel)

 Favourite Male Personality 
 Winner:
 Jimmy Barnes (Max)
 Nominated:
 James Bracey (Sky News)
 James Kerley (Channel [V])
 Cameron Knight (The Comedy Channel)
 Stuart MacGill (LifeStyle Food)
 Darren McMullen (MTV)
 Ben O'Donoghue (The LifeStyle Channel)
 David Speers (Sky News)

 Favourite Female Personality 
 Winner:
 Antonia Kidman (W.)
 Nominated:
 Maz Compton (MTV)
 Helen Dalley (Sky News)
 Charlotte Dawson (FOX8)
 Brooke Forster (Sky News)
 Anna Gare (The LifeStyle Channel)
 Yumi Stynes (Max)
 Maggie Tabberer (Bio.)

Programming & Production
 Most Outstanding International Program or Event 
 Winner:
 The Riches (Showcase)
 Nominated:
 Dexter (Showcase)
 Discovery Atlas: India Revealed (Discovery Channel)
 Mad Men (Movie Extra)

 Most Outstanding Event 
 Winner:
 Nickelodeon Australian Kids' Choice Awards 2007 (Nickelodeon)
 Nominated:
 Australia’s Next Top Model final (FOX8)
 2007 Helpmann Awards (Bio.)
 MTV Australia Video Music Awards 2007 (MTV)
 Sport Australia Hall of Fame (Fox Sports 3)

 Most Outstanding Short Form Program 
 Winner:
 Snoop (MTV)
 Nominated:
 Action Earth (FOX8 and The Weather Channel)
 The Anzac Day interstitial (The History Channel)
 Tipping Point (The Weather Channel)

 Most Outstanding Children’s Program 
 Winner:
 Camp Orange: The Mystery of Spaghetti Creek (Nickelodeon)
 Nominated:
 As the Bell Rings: Treasure Map (Disney Channel)

 Most Outstanding Music Program or Coverage 
 Winner:
 MAX Sessions: Powderfinger, Concert for the Cure (Max)
 Nominated:
 The Lair (MTV)
 MAX Sessions: Jimmy Barnes (Max)
 Rollin' with the Muster (Country Music Channel)
 Snowjam (MTV)

 Most Outstanding Sports Program 
 Winner:
 On the Couch (Fox Sports 1)
 Nominated:
 MTV Sports (MTV)
 NRL on FOX (Fox Sports 3)
 Total Football (Fox Sports 3)

 Most Outstanding Sports Coverage 
 Winner:
 Wallabies (Fox Sports 2)

 Most Outstanding Documentary 
 Winner:
 Thanks for Listening (The History Channel)

 Most Outstanding News Program or Coverage 
 Winner:
 APEC 2007 (Sky News)

 Most Outstanding LifeStyle Program 
 Winner:
 Stuart MacGill Uncorked (LifeStyle Food)

 Most Outstanding Light Entertainment Program 
 Winner:
 The Singing Office (FOX8)

 Most Outstanding Drama 
 Winner:
 The King (TV1)

References

External links
 ASTRA Awards - Official Website
 ASTRA - Australian Subscription Television and Radio Association

ASTRA Awards
Astra Awards, 2008
Astra Awards, 2008